Hopwood Middle School, formerly Hopwood Junior High School, is a secondary school in Saipan, Northern Mariana Islands, a part of the Commonwealth of the Northern Mariana Islands Public School System.

Hopwood Junior High School (HJHS) was founded in 1949 as the Saipan Intermediate School and then renamed in 1962 after Admiral Herbert Gladstone Hopwood of the United States Navy. Admiral Hopwood served as Commander in Chief of the United States Pacific Fleet from 1958 to 1960. He was also the Commanding Officer for the Northern Mariana Islands in the 1950s.

During World War II, the location of the school was a cemetery for the Fourth Marine Division.

HJHS's school mascot is the Hilitai (Mariana monitor lizard), and its school colors are dark blue and gold.

Promotion Ceremony
Every School Year, Hopwood Junior High School has a Promotion Ceremony for  its eighth graders. On this day, they award the Top Ten, the Honorable Mentions, the Principal's Award (Leadership Award), the Commissioner's Award (salutatorian), and the Board of Education Award (valedictorian).

American Scholastic Achievement League (ASAL)
In 2006, Sam Nepaial was the United States Territories’ Champion for the American Scholastic Achievement League.

In 2007, Andrei Seki became the United States Territories’ Champion for the American Scholastic Achievement League.

Both received a Certificate of Merit (which is given to all competitors), a Medal, and a Trophy.

References 
Footnotes

Works cited

 Publicschoolsreport web site entry for the junior high school
 Koki, Stan (1995) "Hopwood: A Pearl of a Junior High School in the Pacific." Educational Innovations in the Pacific, Pacific Resources for Education and Learning. v2 n2 Oct 1995 web link
 House Committee on Appropriations (1978) Department of the Interior and Related Agencies Appropriations for 1978 By U.S. Congress p. 1335
 Petty, Bruce M. (2001) Saipan: Oral Histories of the Pacific War By Bruce M. Petty

External links 
 Hopwood Middle School profile at the Commonwealth of the Northern Mariana Islands Public School System
 
 Web page for the school

Educational institutions established in 1949
Schools in the Northern Mariana Islands
1949 establishments in the Northern Mariana Islands